Marat Tarasov (1 September 1930 – 4 March 2021) was a Russian poet, translator, and journalist.

Biography
His father, who worked at a power station in Kondopoga, was executed in 1932. During World War II, his family evacuated to Vologda Oblast.

In 1951, Tarasov published his first poem in the journal . In 1953, he graduated from Petrozavodsk State University and from Maxim Gorky Literature Institute in 1954. That year, he published his first poetry collection and was admitted to the Union of Soviet Writers in 1955. From 1954 to 1959, he served as head of the poetry department at Sever. From 1959 to 1967, he served as executive secretary of the Writers' Union of the Karelian Autonomous Soviet Socialist Republic. From 2003 to 2017, he was head of the Karelian Union of Writers. He lived in Petrozavodsk in his later life.

Marat Tarasov died on 4 March 2021 at the age of 90.

References

1930 births
2021 deaths
People from Kondopoga
Russian poets
Russian translators
Maxim Gorky Literature Institute alumni